Jonathan Devonte Edwards (born 24 November 1996) is an English professional footballer who plays as a striker for St Ives Town.

Club career
Born in Luton, Edwards joined Peterborough United from Stevenage and signed his first professional contract with the club on 10 March 2015 after a prolific two seasons in the under 18 side. Edwards made his debut in a 1–1 draw against Barnsley on 18 April 2015, replacing goalscorer Conor Washington in the 94th minute of the match. His home debut followed a week later as a second-half substitute in a 4–3 win against Crawley Town. Edwards made his first start for the club on the final day of the season, but was sent off in the second half of a 1–1 draw against Oldham Athletic.

In July 2015, Edwards joined Ilkeston for an original season-long loan but he returned to Peterborough in September. On 27 November 2015, Edwards signed for St Albans City on loan until 2 January 2016. He scored two goals on his debut in the Herts Senior Cup. He subsequently remained with St Albans until 5 March 2016.

On 12 May 2016, following a spell with non-league side Dunstable Town, Hull City announced the signing of Edwards on a one-year contract after a successful trial with the club's U21 squad. On 1 January 2017, Edwards joined EFL League Two club Accrington Stanley on loan until the end of the 2016–17 season. His first appearance was as a substitute against Hartlepool in the 2–2 draw at home. His first start for Accrington Stanley was part of a 3–0 defeat to Cheltenham Town. Edwards was subbed off at the 61st minute.

On 3 July 2017, Edwards signed a new one-year contract with Hull City with an option for a further year. Though he returned to Accrington Stanley on loan for the 2017–18 season.

On 5 January 2018, Edwards joined National League side Woking on loan for the remainder of the campaign. A day later, he made his Woking debut during their 4–4 home draw against Maidstone United, replacing Jason Banton in the 70th minute. Over a month later, Edwards scored his first goal for the club, heading home Woking's second in their 3–2 away defeat to Hartlepool United.

On 13 June 2018, it was announced that Edwards would leave Hull following the conclusion of his contract at the end of the month.

In August 2018, Edwards signed for Halifax Town.

On 18 June 2019, Maidstone United confirmed the signing of Edwards.

After a spell back with Biggleswade Town, following his departure from Maidstone in January 2020, Edwards joined Royston Town ahead of the 2020–21 campaign and went onto score four on his debut during their 6–0 victory over Newmarket Town in the FA Cup.
On 11 August 2021, FC Romania confirmed the signing of Edwards. In July 2022, Edwards joined St Ives Town.

Career statistics

References

External links
 
 

1996 births
Living people
Footballers from Luton
English footballers
Association football forwards
Peterborough United F.C. players
Bishop's Stortford F.C. players
Biggleswade Town F.C. players
Ilkeston F.C. players
St Albans City F.C. players
Dunstable Town F.C. players
Hull City A.F.C. players
Accrington Stanley F.C. players
Woking F.C. players
FC Halifax Town players
Maidstone United F.C. players
Royston Town F.C. players
F.C. Romania players
St Ives Town F.C. players
English Football League players
National League (English football) players
Southern Football League players
Northern Premier League players
Black British sportsmen